Burdett Matthew Coutts (21 September 1919 – 17 March 2016) was an Indian-born Singaporean field hockey player. He competed in the men's tournament at the 1956 Summer Olympics.

References

External links
 

1919 births
2016 deaths
Singaporean male field hockey players
Olympic field hockey players of Singapore
Field hockey players at the 1956 Summer Olympics
Sportspeople from Kochi
Anglo-Indian people
Indian emigrants to Singapore
Singaporean sportspeople of Indian descent
Singaporean emigrants to the United Kingdom
British people of Anglo-Indian descent